The 2019–20 snooker season was a series of professional snooker tournaments played between 9 May 2019 and 22 August 2020. In total, 47 events were held during the season: however, the ending of the season was highly disrupted by the declaration of the COVID-19 pandemic. 18 world ranking tournaments were planned to take place, but only 17 were played. An event was held in Austria, the first time in any snooker season, while the 2020 China Open was cancelled. The Tour Championship and the World Snooker Championship were postponed, and the Gibraltar Open played with no audience. The season contained 128 professional tour players, 35 of which had been given new two-year places on the tour from a combination of invitations and qualifying events.

Judd Trump, the reigning world champion, won a record six ranking titles for a season. Trump also became the second player ever to compile over 100 century breaks in a season. Ronnie O'Sullivan won the 2020 World Snooker Championship, defeating Kyren Wilson with a score of 18–8. O'Sullivan also won his 37th ranking title, the most of any player. The other Triple Crown championships were the 2019 UK Championship, won by Ding Junhui, and the 2020 Masters, won by Stuart Bingham.

Players
The World Snooker Tour in the 2019–20 season consisted of a field of 128 professional players. The highest 64 players on the 2018–19 snooker world rankings after the 2019 World Championship qualified for a place in the field, whilst an additional 29 players who had previously won a two-year tour card also qualified. Eight places were also given to players who were highest on the one-year ranking list, but had not already qualified after the previous tour.

The remaining places were offered by means of invitation and by competing in qualifying events. Three players came from the Challenge Tour, two players came from the CBSA China Tour, and sixteen places were available through the Q School events. The four remaining places were given to continental championship winners, whilst Amine Amiri won the African Billiards & Snooker Confederation's nomination, and an invitational offer was given to longstanding tour player Jimmy White. The following players received a tour card for two seasons:

New professional players

One Year Ranking List

International champions

African Billiards & Snooker Confederation nomination

CBSA China Tour

Challenge Tour

Invitational Tour Card

Q School
Event 1

Event 2

Event 3

Q School Order of Merit

Season summary
The season consisted of a series of different tours. The main tour was the World Snooker Tour, consisting of events that carried both world ranking and invitational points.

Ranking events
The opening ranking event was the Riga Masters, where Mark Joyce and Yan Bingtao reached the finals, both of whom had not won a ranking event prior. Bingtao won the event, the first teenager to win a ranking event since the 2006 Northern Ireland Trophy. Shaun Murphy reached the final in both of the next two ranking tournaments, losing 3–10 to reigning world champion Judd Trump in the International Championship, but winning the China Championship on a  10–9 over Mark Williams. The first of four Home Nations Series events, was won by Mark Selby, defeating David Gilbert 9–1 at the English Open. The next two events were won by Trump, who won the World Open and the Northern Ireland Open. The first of the Triple Crown tournament events—the UK Championship—was held between November and December. Both finalists had won the event before, but neither for over 10 years, with Ding Junhui defeating Stephen Maguire to win the title for the third time. The final ranking event of the year was the Scottish Open, held in December, the third Home Nations event. This event was also won by Selby, who defeated Jack Lisowski with a score of 9–6.

The first ranking event held in 2020 was the European Masters in Austria. This was the first ranking event held in the country. The event was won by Neil Robertson, who completed a whitewash 9–0 victory against Zhou Yuelong. This was the first multisession final whitewash since the 1989 Grand Prix. Robertson also appeared in the final of the next two events, losing to Trump  6–9 in the German Masters, but winning the World Grand Prix 10–8 over Graeme Dott. Murphy won his second title of the season at the Welsh Open, defeating Kyren Wilson 9–1. The one- timed Snooker Shoot Out was won by Michael Holt, his first championship in his 24-year career. Having won four events already in the season, Trump won the Players Championship with a score of 10–4 over Yan and Gibraltar Open with a score of 4–3 over Wilson. Trump's six ranking event wins became the most made by one player in the history of the World Snooker Tour. Due to the COVID-19 pandemic, the Gibraltar Open was played without a live audience in attendance after the first day, and subsequent events were played without fans. The China Open was cancelled due to restrictions.
 The Tour Championship, scheduled for March, was postponed, and was played in June. It was won by Maguire, his first title in seven years. Maguire only qualified for the event after Ding withdrew. The final ranking event and third Triple Crown event of the season was the World Snooker Championship, held in July and August. Used as a trial event for the UK Government, it was originally planned for spectators to be present, but this was revoked after the first day, with audiences also allowed for the final. The championship was won by Ronnie O'Sullivan, defeating Wilson 18–8 in the final. This gave O'Sullivan his sixth world title.

Trump was named World Snooker Player of the Year, Fans' Player of the Year, and Snooker Journalists' Player of the Year. Trump also became the second player ever to compile one hundred century breaks in a season. O'Sullivan received the Performance of the Year award for winning his sixth world title and record breaking 37th ranking title. Louis Heathcote was named Rookie of the Year, whilst Higgins' maximum break at the world championship was named The Magic Moment of the Year.

Other events
The season began with a series of three pro–am tournaments. The Vienna Open was won by Mark Joyce, with the Pink Ribbon being won by Bingham. The World Cup team event was won by Higgins and Maguire representing Scotland. The 2019 Paul Hunter Classic was won by Barry Hawkins over Wilson with a score of 4–3. The 2019 Six-red World Championship, a six-red snooker variant tournament, was won by Maguire, defeating his World Cup winning partner Higgins with a score of 8–6. The 2019 Shanghai Masters was won by O'Sullivan, retaining the championship he won in 2017 and 2018. The Haining Open Chinese pro-am event was won by Thepchaiya Un-Nooh.

The Champion of Champions tournament, with participants being winners of events from the prior 12 months, was won by Robertson, who defeated Trump 10–9 in the final. The second Triple Crown event, the 2020 Masters was won by Bingham, who defeated Ali Carter in the final with a score of 10–8. Carter had not qualified for the event, but was given the place after defending champion O'Sullivan withdrew. The year-long Championship League event was won by Scott Donaldson, with a second Championship League organised as a test event for returning to play after the lockdown. The second event was won by Luca Brecel. A series 10 of Challenge Tour events were held for players not on the main tour, which culminated in a Challenge Tour play-off, won by Allan Taylor over Adam Duffy 4–0.

Calendar 
The following tables outline the dates and results of all events of the World Snooker Tour, the World Seniors Tour, the Challenge Tour, and other events.

World Snooker Tour

World Women's Snooker

World Seniors Tour

Challenge Tour

Other events

World ranking points

The 2019–20 snooker season featured the following points distribution for World Snooker Tour ranking events:

Notes

References

External links 
 Snooker season 2019/2020 at Snooker.org

2019
Season 2019
Season 2020